Albert Proctor Burman (10 March 1893 – 11 May 1974) was an English figure skater. He competed in two events at the 1928 Winter Olympics.

References

1893 births
1974 deaths
Sportspeople from Southport
Olympic figure skaters of Great Britain
Figure skaters at the 1928 Winter Olympics
English male pair skaters